Romantsev is a Russian masculine surname, its feminine counterpart is Romantseva. It may refer to:
Danil Romantsev (born 1993), Russian ice hockey player; and
Oleg Romantsev (born 1954), Russian football coach and former player.

Russian-language surnames